Kaj Leo Kristensen (7 November 1917 – 17 March 1945) was a member of the Danish resistance executed by the German occupying power.

Biography 

Kaj Leo Kristensen was born in Vraaby 7 November 1917 to land owner Ole Ferdinand Kristensen and wife Marie Elisabeth Kristensen and baptized in Vraaby church the first Sunday after Epiphany.

On 26 February 1945 Kristensen and six other members of Holger Danske were arrested by the Gestapo in Skindergade 44, Copenhagen.

On 17 March the same year Kristensen and the six others were executed in Ryvangen.

After his death 

On 19 May 1945 Kristensen's remains were exhumed at Ryvangen.

On 21 July 1945 a memorial service was held for him in Elijah's Church.

On 29 August 1945 Kristensen and 105 other victims of the occupation were given a state funeral in the memorial park founded at the execution and burial site in Ryvangen where his remains had been recovered. Bishop Hans Fuglsang-Damgaard led the service with participation from the royal family, the government and representatives of the resistance movement.

A memorial stone marks the place of his arrest.

References 

1917 births
1945 deaths
People executed by Nazi Germany by firing squad
Danish resistance members
Danish people executed by Nazi Germany
Resistance members killed by Nazi Germany